The Package is a 1989 American political action thriller film directed by Andrew Davis and starring Gene Hackman, Joanna Cassidy, Tommy Lee Jones, John Heard, and Dennis Franz.

Set during the Cold War, the film depicts the U.S. and Soviet governments as they are about to sign a disarmament treaty to completely eliminate nuclear weapons. However, elements within each country's military are vehemently opposed to such a plan, and determined to stop it at all costs.

Plot
Former Green Beret Master Sergeant Johnny Gallagher is part of a U.S. Army unit patrolling outside a chalet in West Berlin, where the U.S. President and the Soviet General Secretary are beginning talks for mutual nuclear disarmament. In another part of the chalet, high-ranking generals from the U.S. and Soviet militaries secretly agree to form a conspiracy to sabotage the talks. When U.S. General Carlson refuses to go along with the plot, he is assassinated outside the chalet by a pair of German hikers who slipped through the chalet's perimeter.

Gallagher is blamed for the disaster, and assigned as punishment to escort an Army sergeant named Walter Henke from West Berlin back to the United States for court martial. After landing at Dulles International Airport, Gallagher is ambushed by an undercover team, who spirit Henke away. Gallagher tracks down Henke's wife and is surprised when she identifies a photo of a different man as her husband. After he leaves, the same undercover team kills Mrs. Henke and phones in an anonymous tip, identifying Gallagher as the killer, who is then is detained on suspicion of murder. Meanwhile, the real Walter Henke is approached in Germany by Colonel Glen Whitacre, who tasks him with a top secret assignment to infiltrate a Neo-Nazi gang in his hometown of Chicago, who they believe are plotting to assassinate the President.

With the help of his ex-wife, Lt. Colonel Eileen Gallagher, and her assistant, Lt. Ruth Butler, Gallagher identifies the man he brought back from Germany as Thomas Boyette, a long-service Army veteran with a history of covert operations. Johnny asks why anyone would impersonate a soldier about to be court-martialed, and the explanation given is that Boyette was able to enter the country without a passport, meaning there is no record of his entry and no way to track his movements.

When the same undercover team kills Butler and attacks Eileen, Johnny rescues her and escapes the base with the help of a friend. The two investigate the conspiracy on their own, starting with trying to find the real Walter Henke in Chicago, where the next phase of the planned peace talks will take place. Johnny approaches his military friend, Milan Delich, who allows the Gallaghers to hide at his house. At a diner, the same undercover team attempts to kill Delich, leaving him wounded. As Delich is taken away by ambulance, conspirators dressed as cops capture Johnny, who is then held in the basement of the safe house where Boyette is staying.

After Boyette leaves for his assignment, Gallagher escapes and speeds toward downtown Chicago, using Boyette's surveillance photos from the basement as a guide to the planned assassination site. Meanwhile, the real Walter Henke is lured into an office building overlooking the site and killed by Boyette, the intention being to frame Henke for the assassination and make it look like he was killed later.

Following a hotel luncheon, the Soviet Press Secretary, one of the conspirators, convinces the General Secretary to make an unplanned stop just outside the hotel's garage for a photo op with émigré Russian families. Before the Secret Service can reach the site, Boyette takes aim at the General Secretary with a sniper rifle, but Gallagher bursts into the room in the nick of time and shoots Boyette dead.

Outside the room where he found Boyette, Gallagher confronts Whitacre and accuses him of trying to start a war for no reason. Angrily, Whitacre says that nuclear weapons are the only thing preventing war, and he and his Soviet counterparts are just smart enough to realize that mutual disarmament would be disastrous for both countries. Gallagher promises to expose the conspiracy and storms away, ignoring Whitacre's threats. On the street, Gallagher reunites with Eileen and hugs her gratefully.

After his confrontation with Gallagher, Whitacre enters a limousine with his Soviet counterpart, who asks him what their next step is. Before he can answer, their driver pulls over the car and shoots both colonels dead, thus ensuring that any blame will fall on them and the remaining conspirators will not be exposed.

Cast 

 Gene Hackman as Johnny Gallagher
 Joanna Cassidy as Eileen Gallagher
 Tommy Lee Jones as Thomas Boyette
 Dennis Franz as Milan Delich
 Reni Santoni as a Chicago Police Lieutenant
 Pam Grier as Ruth Butler
 Chelcie Ross as General Hopkins
 John Heard as Colonel Glen Whitacre
 Ron Dean as Karl Richards
 Kevin Crowley as Walter Henke
 Thalmus Rasulala  as Secret Service Commander
 Marco St. John as Marth

Production notes

Although the story takes place in Germany, Washington, D.C., Arlington, Virginia, and Chicago, the film was shot entirely in Chicago and at the Soviet War Memorial in Tiergarten, Berlin.

Reception
The Package holds a 65% rating on Rotten Tomatoes, based on 17 reviews. Roger Ebert awarded the film three stars out of four, calling it "smarter than most thrillers".

Home video

The film was first released on VHS in 1989. It was released on DVD on January 18, 2000.

References

External links

  
 

1989 films
1989 action thriller films
1980s crime drama films
American action thriller films
American political thriller films
Cold War films
Films directed by Andrew Davis
Films scored by James Newton Howard
Films shot in Chicago
Films shot in Germany
Orion Pictures films
Techno-thriller films
1989 drama films
1980s English-language films
1980s American films